Michael "Mikey" James Peter Hoare (born 14 November 1985) is an English international field hockey player who plays as a defender for England and Great Britain.

Hoare plays club hockey in the Men's England Hockey League Premier Division for Wimbledon.

He was educated at Range High School, Formby, Merseyside.

Hoare made his international debut in 2012.  He competed for England in the men's hockey tournament at the 2014 Commonwealth Games where he won a bronze medal.

He has also played club hockey for Beeston and Bowdon.   Michael is a qualified PE teacher and hockey coach. He is currently the player assistant coach for Wimbledon, Director of Hockey Development at Amersham & Chalfont HC, Hockey professional at Harrow School. As well as the founder and Director of a new coaching company The Hockey Lab.

References

1985 births
Living people
Commonwealth Games bronze medallists for England
English male field hockey players
Male field hockey defenders
2014 Men's Hockey World Cup players
Field hockey players at the 2014 Commonwealth Games
Field hockey players at the 2016 Summer Olympics
2018 Men's Hockey World Cup players
Olympic field hockey players of Great Britain
British male field hockey players
Commonwealth Games medallists in field hockey
Wimbledon Hockey Club players
Beeston Hockey Club players
Men's England Hockey League players
Medallists at the 2014 Commonwealth Games